AELC may refer to:

American Evangelical Lutheran Church, a predecessor church of the Lutheran Church in America, United States 
Andhra Evangelical Lutheran Church, India
Associació d'Escriptors en Llengua Catalana, Association of Catalan Language Writers, a non-profit professional organisation, Spain.
Association of Evangelical Lutheran Churches, a predecessor church body of the Evangelical Lutheran Church in America, United States